Caloptilia dactylifera is a moth of the family Gracillariidae. It is known from China (Jiangxi).

References

dactylifera
Moths of Asia
Moths described in 1990